Viorel Şotropa (5 March 1968 – 1993) was a Romanian cross-country skier. He competed in the men's 10 kilometre classical event at the 1992 Winter Olympics.

References

1968 births
1993 deaths
Romanian male cross-country skiers
Olympic cross-country skiers of Romania
Cross-country skiers at the 1992 Winter Olympics
People from Siret